Jeffrey Werleman is a football goalkeeper and former member of the Aruba national football team. His first club was Caravel.

References

External links

Living people
1983 births
Aruban footballers
Association football goalkeepers
SV Independiente Caravel players
SV Estrella players
SV La Fama players
SV Dakota players
Aruba international footballers